Top Silk is a play by David Williamson concerning two lawyers. It is not regarded as one of his strongest plays but was very successful commercially.

Plot
A legal aid solicitor and a prominent barrister battle over their individual careers and the future of their teenage son.

Reception
The play was better received in Melbourne than Sydney.

Despite relatively poor reviews, including a negative critic from HG Kippax of the Sydney Morning Herald, the 1989 production still earned over $2 million.

References

External links
Top Silk at AustLit

Plays by David Williamson
1989 plays